Fontages Airport  is located  east of Fontanges, Quebec, Canada.

References

James Bay Project
Registered aerodromes in Nord-du-Québec